() is a traditional Italian pasta dish from Naples. It is a typical dish of Neapolitan cuisine and is widely popular. Its popularity can be attributed to it being simple to prepare and the fact that it makes use of inexpensive, readily available ingredients that have long shelf lives in a pantry.

The dish was once also known as "vermicelli alla Borbonica" or also as "vermicelli con le vongole fujute", when in the white version.

The dish is made by first lightly sautéing thinly sliced garlic in olive oil, sometimes with the addition of red pepper flakes (dried chilli – in which case its name is ). The oil and garlic are then tossed with spaghetti cooked in salted water. Finely chopped Italian parsley is then commonly added as a garnish. Although cheese is not included in most traditional recipes, grated parmesan or pecorino cheese can be added, similarly to pasta allo scarpariello. Some recipes recommend to add some of the water from cooking pasta to the olive oil to create a sauce, but other recipes recommend simply pouring the oil onto the drained pasta, which doesn't create a sauce.

See also
List of Italian dishes
 List of pasta dishes

References

External links

video of professional chef cooking spaghetti olio in restaurant

Spaghetti dishes
Neapolitan cuisine
Garlic dishes